Dame Harriet Jane Findlay, Lady Findlay, DBE ( Backhouse; 12 March 1880 – 24 July 1954) was a British political activist and philanthropist.

Life
Harriet Jane Backhouse was the daughter of Sir Jonathan Edmund Backhouse, 1st Bt. (15 November 1849 – 27 July 1918) and Florence Trelawny (died  11 October 1902). She married Sir John Ritchie Findlay, 1st Baronet (son of John Ritchie Findlay and Susan Leslie) on 9 July 1901.

In 1919, Findlay joined Rosaline Masson, Ella Millar and Miss M.R. MacLeod as the first four women to become members of the Cockburn Association, Edinburgh's influential conservation organisation formed in 1875 to protect and preserve the built heritage, natural environment and civic amenity in the city.

She was active in Scottish politics becoming a Justice of the Peace in Edinburgh in 1926 and being elected president of the Scottish Unionist Association in 1927. She chaired the management board of the Edinburgh Royal Infirmary during the Depression. She died on 24 July 1954, aged 74.

DBE
Lady Harriet Findlay was invested as a Dame Commander of the Order of the British Empire (DBE) in 1929 and was styled as Dame Harriet Findlay.

Family
Husband:
 Sir John Ritchie Findlay, 1st Baronet (b. 13 January 1866 – d. 13 April 1930)
Children:
 Elizabeth Findlay (died 1958) 
 Laetitia Florence Findlay (died 5 July 1978)
 Sir John Edmund Ritchie Findlay, 2nd Baronet (b. 14 June 1902 – d. 6 September 1962) 
 Lt.- Col. Sir Roland Lewis Findlay, 3rd Baronet (b. 14 July 1903 – d. 28 July 1979)

References

External links
 Profile, peerage.com; accessed 20 February 2016.
 Portrait, by Sir James Guthrie, wikigallery.org; accessed 25 August 2017
 Portrait, by David Foggie, Scottish National Portrait Gallery; accessed  25 August 2017

Sources
 Charles Mosley, editor, Burke's Peerage, Baronetage & Knightage, 107th edition, 3 volumes (Wilmington, Delaware: Burke's Peerage (Genealogical Books) Ltd., 2003), volume 1, page 208.

1880 births
1954 deaths
Harriet
Dames Commander of the Order of the British Empire
Place of birth missing
Place of death missing
Scottish justices of the peace
Scottish politicians
Harriet
Wives of baronets
Daughters of baronets
20th-century Scottish businesspeople